The Palarong Pambansa (Filipino for "National Games") is an annual multi-sport event involving student-athletes from 17 regions of the Philippines. The event, started in 1948, is organized and governed by the Department of Education.

Student-athletes from public and private schools at elementary and secondary levels can compete, provided they qualified by winning at their regional meet. For young Filipino student-athletes, Palarong Pambansa is the culmination of school sports competition, which start with local school intramurals, followed by the congressional district, provincial, and regional athletic meets.

The objectives of the Palaro are: 
 To promote physical education and sports as an integral part of the basic education curriculum for holistic development of the youth;
 Inculcate the spirit of discipline, teamwork, excellence, fair play, solidarity, sportsmanship, and other values inherent in sports; 
 Promote and achieve peace by means of sports;
 Widen the base for talent identification, selection, recruitment, training and exposure of elementary pupils and secondary students to serve as a feeder to the National Sports Association (NSA) for international competitions; and 
 Provide a database for a valid and universal basis to further improve the school sports development programs.

The legal basis of the Palarong Pambansa is stipulated in the provision of the 1987 Philippine Constitution, Article XIV, Section 19.

History
The first edition of the games was held in Manila in 1948. Before it was called Palarong Pambansa, it was dubbed as Bureau of Public Schools-Interscholastic Athletics Association Games (BPISAA). It continued yearly until it was cancelled in 1957 due to the death of President Ramon Magsaysay. In 1958, Tagbilaran, Bohol hosted the 10th edition of the game. The game was again cancelled in 1972 when President Ferdinand Marcos declared martial law. In 1973, the last BPISAA which was held in Vigan, Ilocos Sur.

In 1974, the Bureau of Public Schools-Interscholastic Athletics Association Games was renamed Palarong Pambansa.

In 1980, 1984-1987 and 1999 Palarong Pambansa was not conducted. In 1980 Palarong Pambansa was substituted with another game called Palarong Bagong Lipunan hosted by Marikina. Between 1984 and 1987 the event's cancellation was due to the People Power Revolution.

Misamis Oriental and Negros Occidental have hosted Palarong Pambansa four times each, more than any other provinces. Misamis Oriental hosted the Palarong Pambansa in 1975, 1977, 1978 and 1988. Negros Occidental hosted the games in 1974, 1979, 1998 and 2000. Lingayen, Pangasinan has hosted three times, in 1959, 1999 and 2012.

Starting with the 2015 edition of the games, the Palarong Pambansa Board, which was created due to the Palarong Pambansa Law signed in May 2014, shall be mainly responsible for the preparation and conduct of the games. The board shall be the main policy-making and coordinating body of the annual tournament.

Participating regions
The regions participating in the annual Palarong Pambansa has become bigger as some regions have split. For instance, Southern Tagalog Regional Athletics Association (STRAA) represented the 10 provinces of Southern Tagalog in the later Palarong Pambansa. But it was divided into two, which is now Region 4-A or the Calabarzon region and Region 4-B or the Mimaropa region. Both are taking part in Palarong Pambansa as different teams or regions.

Creation of administrative and autonomous regions such as Bangsamoro (competing since the 2019 edition) and Cordillera Administrative Region and splitting of big region into new regions like the Southern Mindanao, Central Visayas and Western Visayas causes more teams. All these reasons made the 18 regions participating in Palarong Pambansa.

Defunct regions that have competed in the Palarong Pambansa include the Autonomous Region in Muslim Mindanao (which has been replaced by Bangsamoro) and the short-lived Negros Island Region.

A color coding system was introduced to uniquely identify each region based on their designated colors. Here are the participating regions with their assigned colors.

Sports

Currently, there are 20 sports disciplines and a special event being contested at the Palarong Pambansa. Except for archery (which is not played at the elementary level), competition at the events and disciplines are at the elementary and secondary levels.

In the 2013 Palarong Pambansa in Dumaguete, three demonstration sports were played. These were futsal, wushu and billiards. Below are sports competed at the Palarong Pambansa.

The Department of Education planned to add more events by 2017, particularly for the people with special needs, including the 50-meter and 100-meter runs for athletics and chess for the blind.

 Archery
Arnis
 Aquatics
 Athletics
 Badminton
 Baseball
 Boxing
 Chess
 Football
 Futsal
 Gymnastics
Sepak Takraw
 Softball
 Table tennis
 Taekwondo
 Tennis
 Volleyball
Demonstration Sports
 Billiards
 Wushu
 Wrestling
 Aerobic Gymnastics
 Dancesport
 Pencak Silat
Special events
 Aquatics
 Bocce
 Goalball
 Track Events

Note:
 Introduced as demonstration sports in 2013
 Introduced as demonstration sports in 2015
 Introduced as demonstration sports in 2017
 Elevated as a regular sports discipline in 2017

Arnis was included among the priority sports in Palarong Pambansa and begun in 2010, in accordance to Republic Act No. 9850 in 2009, signed by former President Gloria Macapagal Arroyo.''

Editions

Note:
 1 Hosting of Palarong Pambansa is from Luzon and then Visayas and then back to Luzon and then Mindanao. This order will be repeated. If Visayas have no bids to host the Palaro, then Mindanao will have the rights to host and/or vice versa. If Luzon have no bids, Metro Manila will be going to host the Palaro.
 2 Negros Island Region (NIR) is a newly created region in 2015 which consists of Negros Occidental and Negros Oriental. Any existing previous list and records should be counted for the previous regions they are affiliated with otherwise, their records and statistics should be counted for their present region at the time of their creation unless otherwise specified.
 3 In 2016, the Department of Education (DepEd) used the Olympic Medal System in determining the championship title and ranking position of each region.
 4 The original host was in Occidental Mindoro, but was forced to back-out due to damages brought to the province by Typhoon Tisoy.
 5After the withdrawal of Occidental Mindoro as hosts, Marikina replaced as host city for 2020, but the 2020 Palaro was cancelled due to coronavirus pandemic in the Philippines. However, DepEd has announced that Marikina will retain hosting rights for the 2023 edition of the event, with Negros Occidental and Sorsogon's hosting moved to 2024 and 2025, respectively.

List of hosts

See also
Culture of the Philippines
2011 POC-PSC National Games

References

External links
Official Website
Former Website
2015 Palarong Pambansa official website
Venues for Palarong Pambansa (1947-1992)

 
Student sport in the Philippines
Philippines, Palarong Pambansa
Recurring sporting events established in 1948
Multi-sport events in the Philippines
National youth sports competitions
1948 establishments in the Philippines
Annual sporting events in the Philippines
Youth sport in the Philippines